TOI-178c is a potentially rocky exoplanet that orbits the K-type star TOI 178, 204.4783 light years from Earth. TOI-178c's radius is 1.669 x that of Earth, and its mass is 4.77 that of Earth's, making TOI-178c a super earth. TOI 178c mass was discovered by the radial velocity method with the radius detected by the primary transit method. The orbital radius is 0.037 AU, with an eccentricity of 0.0. A year on TOI-178c is 3.2 days long. TOI-178c was discovered by using the transit method in 2021. TOI-178b, TOI-178d, TOI-178e, TOI-178f, TOI-178g are all in the same system as TOI-178c. The temperature on TOI 178c is 873 Kelvin; the hottest point longitude unknown.

References 

Exoplanets discovered in 2021
Exoplanets discovered by TESS